The Court of Cassation  is one of the four courts of last resort in France. It has jurisdiction over all civil and criminal matters triable in the judicial system; it is the supreme court of appeal in these cases. It has jurisdiction to review the law, as well as to certify questions of law, to determine miscarriages of justice. The Court is located in the Palace of Justice in the 1st arrondissement of Paris.

The Court does not have jurisdiction over cases involving claims against administrators or public bodies, which fall within the jurisdiction of administrative courts, for which the Council of State acts as the supreme court of appeal; nor over cases involving constitutional issues, which fall within the jurisdiction of the Constitutional Council; nor over cases involving disputes about which of these courts has jurisdiction, which are heard by the Jurisdictional Disputes Tribunal. Collectively, these four courts form the topmost tier of the French court system.

The Court was established in 1790 under the name Tribunal de cassation during the French Revolution; its original purpose was to act as a court of error with revisory jurisdiction over lower provincial prerogative courts (parlements). However, much about the Court continues the earlier Paris Parlement.

The Court is the seat of the Network of the Presidents of the Supreme Judicial Courts of the European Union.

Composition

The Court is made up of justices, the Office of the Prosecutor, and an Administrative Office of Courts. In addition, a separate bar of specially certified barristers exists for trying cases at the French Court.

Judges and divisions
Overall, the Court consists of nearly 85 trial judges (conseillers) and about 40 deputy judges (conseillers référendaires), each divided among six different divisions (chambres):
First Civil Division (première chambre civile) deals with contractual liability, international private law, arbitration, consumer law, family law, successions (wills), child custody, professional discipline, individual rights 
Second Civil Division (deuxième chambre civile) handles civil procedural issues, torts, insurance law, social insurance law and electoral matters
Third Civil Division (troisième chambre civile) (or "Land Court") for immovable property (real estate), housing, commercial leases, construction law, urban planning law, environmental law
Commercial Division (chambre commerciale, financière et économique) handles corporate law, bankruptcy, commercial law, business contracts, competition law, financial law and intellectual property rights
Labor Division (chambre sociale) handles labor disputes, worker compensation.
Criminal Division (chambre criminelle) deals with criminal cases and criminal procedural rules

Each division is headed by a presiding justice referred to in French as a président, or President of Division. The Chief Justice bears the title of the premier président, or President of the Court, who supervises the presiding justices of the various divisions. The Chief Justice is the highest-ranking judicial officer in the country and is responsible for administration of the Court and the discipline of justices. The Court also includes 12 masters (auditeurs), the lowest rank of justice, who are primarily concerned with administration.

There is, in addition to the abovementioned six divisions, a separate organization known as the Divisional Court (chambre mixte). The Divisional Court adjudicates where the subject matter of an appeal falls within the purview of multiple divisions. The Bench of the Divisional Court seats the Chief Justice and a number of other judges from at least three other divisions relevant to a given case. Any participating division is represented by its Presiding Justice and two puisne judges.

Finally, a full court (Assemblée plénière) is called, presided over by the Chief Justice or, if he is absent, by the most senior presiding justice. It also seats all divisional presiding justices and senior justices, assisted by a puisne judge from each division. The full court is the highest level of the Court.

Office of the Prosecutor
The prosecution, or parquet général, is headed by the Chief Prosecutor (procureur général). The Chief Prosecutor is a judicial officer, but does not prosecute cases; instead, his function is to advise the Court on how to proceed, analogous to the Commissioner-in-Council's role within the Conseil d'État (lit. Council of State, but function may vary). Duties include filing motions to bring cases before the Court "in the name of the law" and bringing cases before the French Court of Justice (Cour de justice de la République), which tries government officials for crimes committed while in office. The Chief Prosecutor is assisted by two Chief Deputy Prosecutors (premiers avocats généraux) and a staff of about 22 deputy prosecutors (avocats généraux), and two assistant prosecutors (substituts).

Supreme Court bar
Barristers (avocats), though not technically officers of the court, play an integral role in the justice system. Except for a few types of actions, advocate counsel in the form of a barrister is mandatory for any case heard at the Court or Council of State. Barristers with exclusive rights of audience and admitted to practice law in either senior court are titled avocat au Conseil d'État et à la Cour de Cassation, or avocats aux Conseils ("Counsel at Senior Court") for short. Admission to the Supreme Court bar is particularly difficult, requiring special training and passing a notoriously stringent examination. Once admitted, bar members can advise litigants on whether their actions are justiciable, that is, issuable and exceeding de minimis requirements—an important service since the court hears appeals only on points of law and not issues of fact. Membership is restricted to 60 total positions and is considered a public office.

General counsel

In May 2019, Jean-François Ricard was appointed General Counsel at the Court of Cassation to exercise the function of anti-terrorism public prosecutor at the Tribunal de grande instance de Paris, heading a new National Terrorism Prosecution Office (PNAT), beginning on 25 June 2019. He leads a team of 25 magistrates.

Proceedings
The Court's main purpose is to review lower court rulings on the grounds of legal or procedural error. As the highest court of law in France, it also has other duties.

Appeals
The Court has inherent appellate jurisdiction for appeals (called pourvois en cassation) from courts of appeal or, for certain types of small claims cases not appealable to appellate courts, from courts of record. The Supreme Court reviews the appeal on the record and may affirm or set aside lower court rulings; if set aside, the ruling is said to be cassé (French for "quashed"), hence the French name of Cour de cassation, or "Quashing Court". The Court adjudicates by strict appeal, or appeal stricto sensu, which is limited to review of the decision and of the decision-making process on a point of law, and may only allow the appeal in cases of serious error; fresh evidence is not admissible. The typical outcome of a successful appeal is setting aside of the lower court's decision and remittal for reconsideration.

An intermediate appellate court, the Cour d'appel, hears general appeals de novo on points of law and procedure as well as errors of fact and reasoning. The Court of Cassation only decides matters of points of law or procedure on the record, as opposed to factual errors. Lower courts may petition the Court for an interlocutory order during the proceedings on any new and complex point of law; any such order, however, is not final or conclusive.

Appeal procedure
A case is heard by a bench of three or five relevant divisional justices. For either civil or criminal appeals, the bench seats by three judges unless the Chief Justice or the divisional presiding justice orders a full bench of five judges. Furthermore, any one of the three judges originally assigned to the bench may order it expanded to five. If the case falls in the legal areas handled by more than one division, the Chief Justice may order the divisional court, rather than a Bench, to consider the case.

The Court can affirm a decision from below by dismissing the appeal (rejet du pourvoi) or overturn or amend the decision by allowing the appeal (accueil du pourvoi). If it finds that the lower court erred, it sets aside the lower court decision and remits the case with its opinion to an appellate court for reconsideration (cassation avec renvoi). If only a portion of a ruling is overturned, it is called cassation partielle, or partial setting aside. Sometimes, the Court may overturn a lower court ruling and judge the case ex proprio motu without being petitioned (cassation sans renvoi), as long as the merits and facts of the case are on record.

When overturned, the case is remanded to a second appellate court, in other words not the appellate court whose decision is being appealed; never to the same judges. The decision of the Bench of the Court of Cassation or Divisional Court is not binding on the lower court, and the appellate court has full discretion to decide the case, but the higher court's ruling has persuasive authority. The appellate court's ruling may again be appealed to the Court of Cassation. If so, the Full Court hears and judges the case. It may, again, uphold an earlier decision or reverse it and remand the case to another appellate court. In the latter case, the determination of the Full Court is binding; the facts, however, may be reviewed by the court retrying the case.

Published judgments are extremely brief, containing a statement of the case—citing relevant statutory authorities—and a summary of ruling. The ruling does not contain a ratio decidendi in the style of common-law jurisdictions. Instead, it is left to legal experts to explain the importance of rulings. The Court often drastically changes the way the Civil Code or other statutory laws are interpreted. Legal digests, such as the Recueil Dalloz, and treatises written by legal scholars analyze and explain rulings through precedents. Much of this information is available through online databases.

Unlike common-law jurisdictions, there is no doctrine of binding precedent (stare decisis) in France. Therefore, previous decisions of higher courts do not bind lower courts in the same hierarchy, though they are often followed and have persuasive authority. Instead, the French legal system subscribes to the legal doctrine of jurisprudence constante according to which courts should follow a series of decisions that are in accord with each other and judges should rule on their own interpretation of the law.

Criminal appeals
Major felonies (indictable offences), called crimes in French, are tried by jury in a county Court of Assizes. In the past, their decisions were not open to appeal in an intermediate appellate court, and before 2001, could only be appealed to the Supreme Court. The Court would review the case on points of procedure and law only, and when handing down a reversal, which was uncommon except for capital punishment cases, vested a second Court of Assizes to retry the case. An argument in favor of this system was that allowing appeals to be tried by active judges after having been decided by a jury would in essence deny popular sovereignty. Since 2001, Assize court rulings may be appealed on points of fact to a Court of Assizes in another county, vested by the Court, and before a larger jury. The case is then fully retried. For procedural issues, appeals to the Supreme Court are still possible since assize courts, which operate by jury trial, would not be competent to hear them.

Certified questions
Where no appeal has been made but the government disagrees with the lower court's interpretation of the law, it may order the Chief Prosecutor to "lay an appeal before the Court in the interest of law" (former un pourvoi dans l'intérêt de la loi), i.e., appeal to certify a question of general public importance. The Chief Prosecutor may do so sua sponte or at the Court's behest in either civil or criminal cases. The Court will then issue an advisory opinion which has no bearing on the lower court's ruling since it was satisfactory to all parties involved and no motion was made to appeal. If the government is dissatisfied with the law as stated by the courts, it may ask Parliament to rewrite the law, as long as no constitutional issue is involved.

Other duties
The Court publishes an annual report on the French court system. The report includes a section with suggested changes to laws concerning the legal system, including criminal procedure. The Court awards damages to defendants exonerated after incarceration. Some high-level members of the court are ex officio members of special ad hoc courts; the investigatory commission of the High Court of Justice (Haute Cour de Justice), which may be convened to try the French President for high treason; the French Court of Justice (Cour de Justice de la République), which may be convened to try current or former cabinet ministers for crimes committed while in office; and the National Judicial Council (Conseil supérieur de la magistrature), which serves as a court of judicial discipline and disciplinary counsel. The High Court of Justice has never been convened during the Fifth Republic and the French Court of Justice, only rarely.

Other related courts
The Court is not the only court of last resort in France. Cases involving claims against government bodies, local authorities, or the central government, including all delegated legislation (e.g., statutory instruments, ministerial orders), are heard by the administrative courts, for which the court of last resort is the Conseil d'État. In cases where there appears to be concurrent jurisdiction or a conflict of laws between the judicial and administrative courts, whether both retain jurisdiction ("positive dispute") or decline jurisdiction ("negative dispute"), the Jurisdictional Disputes Court (Tribunal des Conflits) decides the issue. The Court is composed of 4 members from both senior courts and occasionally, to break a tie, the justice minister who, if present, presides.

Neither court has the power to strike down primary legislation, such as acts of Parliament. The courts can, however, refuse to apply any statutory provision they consider inconsistent with France's international treaty obligations. Constitutional review lies in the Constitutional Council, which can strike down any law that it deems unconstitutional. Before a law is enacted, the French President, the speaker of either house of Parliament, or, more commonly, 60 parliamentarians from the same house may petition the Council for review. Some laws, mostly constitutional laws (loi organique), come before the Constitutional Council for review without first being petitioned. Courts may adopt a restrictive approach to applying statute. A 2009 reform, effective on 1 March 2010, enables parties to a lawsuit or trial to question the constitutionality of the law that is being applied to them. The procedure, known as question prioritaire de constitutionnalité, is broadly as follows: the question is raised before the trial judge and, if it has merit, it is forwarded to the appropriate supreme court (Council of State if the referral comes from an administrative court, Cour de Cassation for other courts). The supreme court collects such referrals and submits them to the Constitutional Council. If the Constitutional Council rules a law is unconstitutional, the law is struck down and no longer has legal force; this decision applies to everybody and not just the appelant in the case at hand.

The European Court of Human Rights (ECtHR) has jurisdiction over claims of government violations in breach of the European Convention on Human Rights in any ECHR member country, which includes all EU member countries. Before the ECtHR grants appeal, a claimant must have exhausted all available judicial recourse in the violating country; in France this means following the appeals process to either of the senior courts. Even so, the ECtHR has original jurisdiction, not appellate jurisdiction.

Additionally, French courts may petition the European Court of Justice to  certify a question of law concerning EU law.

See also

Notes

External links

Official site
Cour de cassation cases (English translations)

Judiciary of France
Society of France
Judiciaries
Courts in France
France
1790 establishments in France
Courts and tribunals established in 1790